St Patrick's Church is a Roman Catholic parish church in Newport, Wales. It was built from 1962 to 1962 for the Rosminians, who continue to serve the church. It is situated on Cromwell Road near the city centre. Its interior was furnished by Jonah Jones and it is a Grade II listed building.

History

Foundation
In 1890, the population of Newport increased with the opening of a steel mill by John Lysaght and Co. In 1909, a building on Corporation Road was bought to act as a place of worship for the increasing Catholic population. In 1925, a church made of iron was built on Cromwell Road and it became the centre of the new parish. The church itself was also made by John Lysaght and Co., was designed by Cyril F. Bates and had a capacity of 550 people. It was opened by the Archbishop of Cardiff Francis Mostyn. In 1927, a presbytery was built and in 1947, a church hall.

Construction
In 1962, building work started on a larger church, with a capacity of 600. As before, it was designed by Cyril Bates. Construction was done by Noel T. James Ltd. On 28 August 1963, the church was opened by the Archbishop of Cardiff, John Murphy. On 10 June 1980, the church was consecrated. It has mosaics, a baldacchino, the east window and carvings above the chancel all designed by Jonah Jones.

Parish
The church remains in its own parish, which is still served by the Rosminians. Its Sunday Masses are at 6:00pm on Saturday and at 10:00am on Sunday.

See also
 Archdiocese of Cardiff

References

External links
 
 Rosminians UK
 

Churches in Newport, Wales
Grade II listed churches in Newport, Wales
Grade II listed Roman Catholic churches in Wales
Modernist architecture in Wales
1925 establishments in Wales
Religious organizations established in 1925
Roman Catholic churches completed in 1963
20th-century Roman Catholic church buildings in the United Kingdom
Rosminian churches in the United Kingdom
Roman Catholic churches in Wales